Michael Edward Walsh, commonly known as Eddie Walsh, is a senior foreign correspondent who covers diplomacy, defense, trade, and cultural issues in Africa and the Asia-Pacific region.

Career 
His work has featured across a variety of news media publications, including Al Jazeera English, The Washington Times, The Diplomat, The Korea Times, Korea JoongAng Daily, AOL, MSN, Gulf News, Jakarta Globe, and The Jerusalem Post. He also has been published in a number of academic journals and served as an author for Ashgate Publishing. He is best known for his reporting on Syria and one-on-one interviews with DC-based ambassadors.

Outside of his reporting duties, Walsh serves an Adjunct Fellow for Emerging Technologies and High-end Threats at the Federation of American Scientists, Senior Fellow at the Center for Australian and New Zealand Studies at Georgetown University, WSD-Handa fellow at Pacific Forum CSIS, a full member of the International Network of Emerging Nuclear Specialists, and Vice Chair of the International Correspondents Committee at the US National Press Club.

Education 
He received his BA from Johns Hopkins, MA from the Paul H. Nitze School of Advanced International Studies, and executive education from Harvard Business School and Wharton School of the University of Pennsylvania.

References

External links
Eddie Walsh profile, Al Jazeera English

Living people
Year of birth missing (living people)
Place of birth missing (living people)
American war correspondents
Johns Hopkins University alumni
Paul H. Nitze School of Advanced International Studies alumni
Harvard Business School alumni
Wharton School of the University of Pennsylvania alumni